Baotashan Subdistrict is a subdistrict in Baota District, Yan'an, Shaanxi Province, China. The subdistrict had a population of 67,388 as of 2010.

Administrative divisions 
Baotashan Subdistrict is divided into 7 residential communities:

Yangjialing Residential Community, Wangjiaping Residential Community, Dongguan Street Residential Community, Dongfeng Residential Community, Xiangyang Residential Community, Dongyuan Residential Community, and Baotashan Residential Community.

See also
List of township-level divisions of Shaanxi

References

Coordinates on Wikidata
Subdistricts of the People's Republic of China
Township-level divisions of Shaanxi
Baota District